Isaac McCandlish McDowell was a Scottish footballer and football manager who played as an inside-right for Dunoon Athletic, Glasgow Perthshire, Airdrieonians, Dumbarton, King's Park, Cowdenbeath, Port Vale, Coleraine, Linfield, and Ards. He later managed Ards, Linfield and Glentoran.

Playing career
McDowell played for Dunoon Athletic, Glasgow Perthshire, Airdrieonians, Dumbarton, King's Park, and Cowdenbeath, before he joined English club Port Vale – initially as a guest player during World War II – in October 1944. He made his debut in a 4–1 defeat to Leicester City at Filbert Street in a Football League North match on 21 October. He became a regular in the first team, and scored eight goals in 36 wartime matches and three goals in four FA Cup games, before he departed in January 1946 after being "directed to undertake essential work in Scotland".

Management career
McDowell managed Ards from 1951 to 1953. He managed Linfield from 1960 to 1962. He led the club to seven trophies in the 1961–62 season: the Irish League championship, Irish Cup, County Antrim Shield, Gold Cup, City Cup, Ulster Cup, and the North-South Cup. They could have won an eighth trophy, but failed to win the Irish Intermediate Cup.  They had finished level on points with Portadown in the league, but beat Portadown 3–1 in a play-off match to claim the title. Forward Bobby Braithwaite later recalled that "Isaac McDowell kept us focused on each game and I recall that it was only after Portadown drew with the Glens [Glentoran] to set up a play-off match for the title that we realised what we could possibly achieve". They won the County Antrim Shield by beating Glentoran 5–0 in the final. McDowell went on to manage Glentoran from 1962 to 1964. In December 2006, the Belfast Telegraph reported that he died in South Africa "a few years ago".

Career statistics
Source:

Honours
Linfield
Irish League: 1961–62
Irish Cup: 1961–62
County Antrim Shield: 1961–62
Gold Cup: 1961–62
City Cup: 1961–62
Ulster Cup: 1961–62
North-South Cup: 1961–62

References

Footballers from Glasgow
Scottish footballers
Association football inside forwards
Glasgow Perthshire F.C. players
Airdrieonians F.C. players
Dumbarton F.C. players
King's Park F.C. players
Cowdenbeath F.C. players
Port Vale F.C. wartime guest players
Port Vale F.C. players
Coleraine F.C. players
Linfield F.C. players
Ards F.C. players
Scottish Football League players
Scottish football managers
Ards F.C. managers
Linfield F.C. managers
Glentoran F.C. managers
Scottish Junior Football Association players